Sir Allan Ross Welsh  (8 July 1875 – 1957) was a Rhodesian lawyer and politician. He was Speaker of the Southern Rhodesian Legislative Assembly from 1935 to 1952.

Early life and family
Welsh was born in Bedford, Eastern Cape to Alexander Robert Welsh, a Presbyterian clergyman from Scotland, and Bertha Solomon, the first woman barrister in South Africa and the first woman member of the South African Parliament. He was educated at Dale College in King William's Town. He passed his final law exams in 1896 and was admitted to the Cape Supreme Court as an attorney and notary.

In 1901, Welsh married Maude Marianne Smit, daughter of N.H. Smit JP of Seymour, Cape Province, and had three daughters.

Legal career
In 1897, Welsh went to work as a clerk in the firm of Solomon and Thomson, founded by his uncle Sir Edward Philip Solomon, in Johannesburg. Two years later he joined the firm of Frames and Grimmer in Bulawayo as managing clerk. Charles Coghlan arrived in Bulawayo in 1900 and the firm became Frames and Coghlan. However, in 1902 Frames left for Johannesburg and dissolved the partnership with Coghlan. Welsh became a partner of the firm on 1 January 1903 and they practised as Coghlan and Welsh.

In 1907 the firm opened an office in Salisbury with Bernard Tancred as partner and the firm changed name to Coghlan, Welsh and Tancred. When Tancred died in 1911, Coghlan invited Ernest Lucas Guest to join as partner and the firm changed to Coghlan, Welsh and Guest.

Politics

Welsh was elected in 1927 to the Southern Rhodesian Legislative Assembly as the member for Bulawayo North, replacing Sir Charles Coghlan, who had died in office, and was re-elected several times until 1935. He succeeded Lionel Cripps as Speaker of the Assembly in 1935 and served until 1952. Cripps was not a member of the House and Welsh did not contest any further elections after 1935.

Business activities
Welsh was a director of Rhodesia Sugar Refinery, Ltd and of Knitting and Clothing Factory.

Honours
He was knighted in July 1943 and in 1952 he was appointed Companion of the Order of St Michael and St George and also granted permission to retain the title Honourable, having served more than three years as Speaker of the Legislative Assembly of Southern Rhodesia.

He was also appointed Grand Commander of the Order of the Phoenix by King Paul of Greece in 1950, in recognition of services rendered during the Second World War.

Death and legacy
Welsh died in Bulawayo aged 82. He was photographed by the Bassano studio in London in 1937 and the prints reside with the National Portrait Gallery, London.

References

Bibliography

External links
 Coghlan, Welsh & Guest

Grand Commanders of the Order of the Phoenix (Greece)
Rhodesian politicians
Members of the Legislative Assembly of Southern Rhodesia
Rhodesian lawyers
1875 births
1957 deaths
White Rhodesian people
South African Companions of the Order of St Michael and St George
South African knights
People from Raymond Mhlaba Local Municipality
South African emigrants to Rhodesia
Rhodesian Presbyterians
White South African people
Cape Colony people